Celso Luís de Matos (born 1 August 1947) is a former Portuguese footballer who played as midfielder.

External links 
 
 
 

1947 births
Living people
Portuguese footballers
Association football midfielders
Primeira Liga players
Boavista F.C. players
FC Porto players
Portugal international footballers